Scrambled Brains is a 1951 short subject directed by Jules White starring American slapstick comedy team The Three Stooges (Moe Howard, Larry Fine and Shemp Howard). It is the 132nd entry in the series released by Columbia Pictures starring the comedians, who released 190 shorts for the studio between 1934 and 1959.

Plot
Moe and Larry are at a sanatorium where Shemp is being treated for suffering from hallucinations. Before being prematurely released, Shemp insists on saying farewell to his new fiancée, beautiful nurse Nora (Babe London). When Nora calls out to Shemp, she appears, much to the scare of Moe and Larry: poor Nora is a homely, toothless thing who seems to have won Shemp's heart. It then becomes clear that Shemp is far from cured, and needs additional therapy.

While Shemp is home, the boys receive a visit from Dr. Gesundheit (Emil Sitka). The doctor, who suffers from poor eyesight, tries his best to cure Shemp, but runs into difficulty when the stubborn stooge refuses to swallow a sleeping pill. Later, Shemp hallucinates an extra set of hands while enduring his piano lesson. On the verge of a nervous breakdown, Shemp insists on seeing Nora, with hopes of finally getting married.

On their way to the doctor, the Stooges become wedged in a phone booth with a stranger (Vernon Dent), leading to a fist fight, making a mess from the foods the stranger had in his grocery bag. The physical altercation results in the phone booth toppling on its side where the Stooges escape.

Back in their apartment, they find Nora waiting for her father—who happens to be the man the Stooges brawled with in the phone booth. Trying to escape, the Stooges knock themselves out thinking that the silhouette on the wall is a window. Nora claims Shemp as her own, carrying him away.

Cast
 Moe Howard as Moe
 Larry Fine as Larry
 Shemp Howard as Shemp
 Babe London as Nora
 Pamela Britton as pretty Nora
 Vernon Dent as Nora's father
 Emil Sitka as Dr. Gesundheit
 Royce Milne as Little Mary Belle
 Johnny Kascier as orderly

Production notes
Scrambled Brains was filmed on March 21–23, 1950, 16 months before it was released. Larry Fine often cited this film as his all-time favorite, with You Nazty Spy! and Cuckoo on a Choo Choo his runners-up. He would often screen this film during his last days residing at the Motion Picture & Television Country House and Hospital.

The gag of making a doll whine by leaning a rocking chair on it was borrowed from Laurel and Hardy's 1940 film Saps at Sea.

References

External links 
 
 
Scrambled Brains at threestooges.net

1951 films
1951 comedy films
The Three Stooges films
American black-and-white films
Films directed by Jules White
Columbia Pictures short films
American comedy short films
1950s English-language films
1950s American films